Henri Joona Julius Laaksonen (born 31 March 1992) is a Swiss professional tennis player. His highest singles ranking is world No. 84, which he achieved on 14 February 2022, and his highest doubles ranking is world No. 191, achieved on 24 December 2018.

Early life
Laaksonen's father, Sandro Della Piana, is a former Swiss tennis player. His mother is from Finland. His parents separated very early in his life, but he nonetheless kept contact with his father.

He started playing tennis at the age of 3. During his adolescent years he lived in Hyvinkää where he was coached by Pasi Virtanen. At 16, he became European champion for the Under-16s category.

In 2009, he moved to Switzerland to train at the Swiss Tennis National Tennis Center in Bienne.

Before January 2011, he represented his country of birth, Finland. Since then, he has represented Switzerland.

Professional career

2021: Success at Grand Slams: two third rounds & two top-20 wins, return to top 100 in two years
Laaksonen won the biggest match of his career at the 2021 French Open against world No. 11 Roberto Bautista Agut in four sets in order to advance to a Grand Slam third round for the first time in his career.

At the 2021 US Open he reached the third round of a Major only for the second time in his career defeating world No. 19 and sixteenth seed Christian Garin in four sets.

He won his sixth Challenger title at the 2021 Open d'Orléans defeating Dennis Novak. As a result, he returned to the top 100 at world No. 98 on 4 October 2021, five spots shy of his career-high ranking of No. 93 reached more than two years ago on 15 July 2019.

2022: Career-high in top 85 and year-end ranking out of top 150
He reached a career-high ranking of World No. 84 on 14 February 2022 after qualifying for the 2022 Rotterdam Open. As of 20 June 2022 he became the No. 1 Swiss player ahead of Roger Federer before being overtaken on 29 August 2022 by Marc-Andrea Huesler.

He reached the Challenger final in Hamburg, losing to compatriot Alexander Ritschard, after he retired in the second set when Ritschard was 7-5, 6-5 up and had 40-30 on his service game, climbing 9 positions back to No. 171 in the singles rankings on 24 October 2022.
He reached another final at the Challenger in Roanne losing to Hugo Gaston and climbed 27 positions up to No. 155 on 14 November 2022. He finished the year ranked No. 171 on 21 November 2022.

2023: Out of top 200
He fell out of the top 200 to No. 203 on 20 March 2023.

Davis Cup career and controversy
He initially was called to play for Switzerland for the first round against the Czech Republic in 2013. In September 2013, Switzerland played against Ecuador in Neuchâtel for the Davis Cup World Group play-off. Laaksonen was called to play with Stanislas Wawrinka, Marco Chiudinelli, and Michael Lammer. However, Laaksonen was excluded from the team following his behavior during Thursday practice.

Wawrinka said: "There are very few promising young players [in Switzerland]. Unfortunately, among them, there are some who believe that everything is allowed and everything is granted for free. If Henri is not here today, it is because there are certain things we cannot accept. I also dislike his behaviour. Someone in his age, with his ranking and who has been supported by Swiss Tennis for many years and thinks he can not fully commit to a practice session and even complains about the coach, cannot be part of the team". Wawrinka added that he "never wants to be on a tennis court with him again". Further to this tie, Wawrinka and Laaksonen never appeared together in a team competition.

Laaksonen later was fined and received a formal warning from the Swiss Tennis Federation. The amount of the fine never was disclosed.

He was left out from the first round tie of the World Group against Serbia in February 2014, but called back for the second round tie in Geneva against Kazakhstan in April 2014. He replaced Chiudinelli, who had won the doubles in Serbia (with Lammer). However, Laaksonen did not play in any of the rubbers as the top players Roger Federer and Stan Wawrinka were in both the singles matches and the doubles. Switzerland won the tie with 3:2. For the semifinal against Italy in September 2014, Laaksonen was not part of the team. He was replaced by Chiudinelli. For the final against France, Chiudinelli and Lammer were nominated.

In 2015, after talks with the team and the captain, Laaksonen was called upon to play in the first round against Belgium in Liège. He won his two singles in five sets against Ruben Bemelmans and Steve Darcis. He took on the leader role for the young team present.

In September 2016, Switzerland played against Uzbekistan in Tashkent in the world-group playoffs. Laaksonen was again the Swiss team leader and secured the winning points. Because of its victory against Uzbekistan, Switzerland remained in the World Group.

For the 2017 Davis Cup World Group, Laaksonen played both singles and doubles in Switzerland's tie with the United States. In the World Group Play-offs against Belarus, despite losing his first singles rubber, Laaksonen defeated Dzmitry Zhyrmont with Switzerland behind 2−1 in the tie. The team won the final rubber and remained in the World Group.

Laaksonen opened Switzerland's 2018 Davis Cup World Group tie against Kazakhstan, losing in four sets. He won both his singles matches in the World Group Play-off tie against Sweden, but these were the only points Switzerland registered as the team was relegated from the World Group.

Laaksonen was again the Swiss number one in the first tie of the newly formatted 2019 Davis Cup, with Switzerland playing Russia on February 1 and 2, 2019 in the Qualifying Round, at the Swiss Tennis Arena in Biel. Switzerland lost the tie 1–3 and then lost to Slovakia in September. Due to this performance, Switzerland was relegated to the second division.

In 2020, away against Peru in Lima, Laaksonen won his first match but lost the decisive rubber against the top Peruvian player Juan Pablo Varillas, resulting in Switzerland's relegation to Group II, the third level of world's tennis.

In 2021, Laaksonen won both singles matches as Switzerland won 5–0 against Estonia in World Group II.

Performance timelines

Singles
Current through the 2022 US Open (tennis).

ATP Challenger and ITF Futures finals

Singles: 18 (8–10)

Doubles: 12 (4–8)

Record against top 10 players 
Laaksonen's match record against players who have been ranked world No. 10 or higher is as follows, with those who have been No. 1 in boldface.  Only ATP Tour main draw and Davis Cup matches are considered.

 Matteo Berrettini 1–0
 Roberto Bautista Agut 1–1
 Felix Auger-Aliassime 0–1
 Tomáš Berdych 0–1
 Novak Djokovic 0–1
 David Ferrer 0–1
 David Goffin 0–1
 Karen Khachanov 0–1
 Juan Mónaco 0–1
 Kei Nishikori 0–1
 Andrey Rublev 0–1
 Casper Ruud 0–1
 Denis Shapovalov 0–1
 Jack Sock 0–1
 Dominic Thiem 0–1
 Fernando Verdasco 0–1
 Juan Martín del Potro 0–2
 Richard Gasquet 0–2
 John Isner 0–2
 Daniil Medvedev 0–2

* .

References

External links 
 
 
 

People from Biel/Bienne
People from Lohja
Swiss male tennis players
Finnish male tennis players
Swiss people of Finnish descent
Finnish people of Swiss descent
1992 births
Living people
Sportspeople from Uusimaa
Sportspeople from the canton of Bern